Peter Ananya (born 23 June 1988) is a Ghanaian cricketer. He was named as the captain of Ghana's squad for the 2017 ICC World Cricket League Division Five tournament in South Africa. He played in Ghana's opening fixture, against Germany, on 3 September 2017.

References

External links
 

1988 births
Living people
Ghanaian cricketers
Place of birth missing (living people)